Senator Adelman may refer to:

David I. Adelman (born 1964), Georgia State Senate
Lynn Adelman (born 1939), Wisconsin State Senate